Chimney Peak is a  mountain summit located within Olympic National Park in Jefferson County of Washington state. Chimney Peak is situated near the head of Elwha Valley, and immediately north above Enchanted Valley. Enchanted Valley is also known as Valley of 10,000 Waterfalls, and numerous waterfalls tumble down the immense cliffs of Chimney Peak. Neighbors include Crystal Peak,  to the north, White Mountain  to the east, and West Peak  to the northeast. Precipitation runoff from the mountain drains north to the Elwha River, and south to the Quinault River.

History
This landform was originally named "Old Snowback" in 1890 by Charles Barnes of the 1889-90 Seattle Press Expedition. The mountain's present, official, descriptive name is attributable to a 100-foot-high chimney-like tower on the peak's west aspect, which is known as "The Chimney". The first ascent of the summit was made in 1941 by Tolvo J. Nelson of the United States Geological Survey. The first ascent of The Chimney was made in 1970 by Mike Banner and Vern Johnson via  climbing.

Climate

Based on the Köppen climate classification, Chimney Peak is located in the marine west coast climate zone of western North America. Most weather fronts originate in the Pacific Ocean, and travel east toward the Olympic Mountains. As fronts approach, they are forced upward by the peaks of the Olympic Range, causing them to drop their moisture in the form of rain or snowfall (Orographic lift). As a result, the Olympics experience high precipitation, especially during the winter months. During winter months, weather is usually cloudy, but due to high pressure systems over the Pacific Ocean that intensify during summer months, there is often little or no cloud cover during the summer. The months June through September offer the most favorable weather for viewing or climbing this peak.

Geology

The Olympic Mountains are composed of obducted clastic wedge material and oceanic crust, primarily Eocene sandstone, turbidite, and basaltic oceanic crust. The mountains were sculpted during the Pleistocene era by erosion and glaciers advancing and retreating multiple times.

See also

 Olympic Mountains
 Geology of the Pacific Northwest

Gallery

References

External links

 
 Weather forecast: Chimney Peak

Olympic Mountains
Mountains of Washington (state)
Mountains of Jefferson County, Washington
Landforms of Olympic National Park
North American 2000 m summits